Summer Game Fest is a live video game event organized and hosted by game journalist Geoff Keighley. The event takes place annually over multiple live streams during the American summer period. It was created in 2020 following the cancellation of the industry's most prominent events, E3 and Gamescom, due to the COVID-19 pandemic.

List of events

History

2020

Games journalist Geoff Keighley had been working with the ESA since before 2000 to support the E3 convention typically held in June of each year, including running the E3 Coliseum, a side event to give developers and their games more exposure than the standard press conferences. Ahead of the planned E3 2020 show, the ESA had announced a number of changes to its approach, aiming the content of the show towards what it described as a "fan, media and influencer festival". This change of approach was criticized by some in the industry, and Sony Interactive Entertainment announced that it would not be participating in the event, after missing E3 2019, as the vision offered by the ESA did not match its expectations; Keighley also opted out of the show, noting he did not "feel comfortable participating" due to the changes.

Because of the COVID-19 pandemic, the ESA canceled the physical event for E3 in 2020. Keighley began working with numerous developers and publishers to run a four-month Summer Game Fest from May 1 to August 24, 2020, helping developers and publisher to host live streams and other events in lieu of the cancellation of E3 and Gamescom. Alongside Summer Game Fest, Keighley promoted the third Steam Game Festival, following after The Game Awards 2019 and from the previously canceled 2020 Game Developers Conference, which ran from June 16–22, 2020. Over 900 games had demos available on Steam for players to try, alongside a slate of interviews with developers throughout the period. A similar event for Xbox One games occurred from July 21–27, 2020, as part of the Summer Game Fest.

Among games and other announcements made during the Summer Game Fest 2020 included:
 Tony Hawk's Pro Skater 1 + 2, a remastered version of Tony Hawk's Pro Skater and its sequel for modern systems.
 Unreal Engine 5, the next iteration of Epic Games' game engine to be released in mid-2021.
 Star Wars: Squadrons, a new game from Motive Studios and Electronic Arts featuring team-play combat using the spacecraft of the Star Wars universe like X-wing fighters and TIE fighters.
 Crash Bandicoot 4: It's About Time, a sequel to the original trilogy of Crash Bandicoot games on the original PlayStation console, being developed by Toys for Bob and Activision.
 Cuphead releasing for the PlayStation 4.

2021
The second Summer Game Fest took place from June 10 to July 22, 2021. From June 15–21, 2021, ID@Xbox offered a number of demos of upcoming games on the Xbox platform as part of the Summer Game Fest.

The Summer Game Fest opened with an announcement stream of games hosted by Keighley on June 10, 2021. Among titles presented include:

 Among Us
 The Anacrusis
 Back 4 Blood
 Call of Duty: Warzone
 The Dark Pictures Anthology: House of Ashes
 Death Stranding Director's Cut 
 Elden Ring
 Escape from Tarkov
 Evil Dead: The Game
 Fall Guys 
 Jurassic World Evolution 2 
 Lost Ark
 Metal Slug Tactics
 Monster Hunter Stories 2: Wings of Ruin 
 Overwatch 2
 Planet of Lana
 Salt and Sacrifice
 Solar Ash
 Tales of Arise
 Tiny Tina's Wonderlands 
 Two Point Campus
 Valorant
 Vampire: The Masquerade - Bloodhunt

The Summer Game Fest included the first Tribeca Games Spotlight on June 11, 2021, featuring games that had been nominated for the inaugural Tribeca Film Festival video game award. These games included:

 The Big Con
 Harold Halibut
 Kena: Bridge of Spirits
 Lost in Random
 NORCO
 Sable
 SIGNALIS
 12 Minutes

Koch Media presented a showcase on June 11, 2021, as part of the Summer Game Fest. Alongside introducing their new publishing label, Prime Matter, Koch Media's presenting covered the following games:

 The Chant
 Codename Final Form
 Crossfire: Legion
 Dolman
 Echoes of the End
 Encased
 Gungrave G.O.R.E.
 King's Bounty 2
 The Last Oricru
 Painkiller 2
 Payday 3
 Scars Above

Sony participated in the event by holding a State of Play on July 8, 2021. Announcements made during the event include:

 Arcadegeddon
 Deathloop
 Death Stranding: Director's Cut
 Demon Slayer -Kimetsu no Yaiba- The Hinokami Chronicles
 F.I.S.T.
 Hunter's Arena: Legends
 Jett: The Far Shore
 Lost Judgment
 Moss: Book II
 Sifu
 Tribes of Midgard

2022

The third Summer Game Fest ran throughout June 2022, with its core programming from June 9–12. Participating publishers with individual showcases included Capcom, Devolver Digital, Epic Games, Nintendo, Netflix, Sony, and Xbox.

2023
The fourth Summer Game Fest will take place in June 2023, as a combined digital and physical event for the first time; a physical component was available to the press in 2022.

See also 
Brasil Game Show
Consumer Electronics Show
Gamercom
Tokyo Game Show

References 

Video game festivals
Festivals established in 2020